Roberto García Gracia (born 20 August 1975 in Fuendejalón) is a retired Spanish athlete who competed mostly in the 5000 metres. He finished fourth at the 2002 European Championships in Munich.

Competition record

Personal bests
Outdoor
1500 metres – 3:38.34 (Huelva 2005)
3000 metres – 7:39.97 (San Sebastián 2002)
Two miles – 8:40.13 (Linz 2005)
5000 metres – 13:16.13 (San Sebastián 2004)
Indoor
1500 metres – 3:45.69 (Valencia 2001)
3000 metres – 7:43.59 (Seville 2001)

References

RFEA profile

1975 births
Living people
Spanish male long-distance runners
Olympic athletes of Spain
Athletes (track and field) at the 2004 Summer Olympics
Universiade medalists in athletics (track and field)
People from Campo de Borja
Sportspeople from the Province of Zaragoza
Universiade silver medalists for Spain
Athletes (track and field) at the 2005 Mediterranean Games
Mediterranean Games competitors for Spain
21st-century Spanish people